Kevin Michael Rankin (born 26 August 1971) is a retired American/Turkish professional basketball player. He stands 2.10 m (6'11") tall and played the power forward and center positions.

Amateur career
After playing high school basketball in Wisconsin, Rankin played NCAA Division I college basketball at Northwestern University.  He attended the university from 1990 to 1994, compiling a distinguished academic and athletic record.

Rankin started 111 of the 112 games he played at Northwestern and led the Wildcats in rebounding all four seasons, with a high of 8.4 per game during his junior season of 1992–1993.  He remains the school's all-time leader in career blocked shots with 133.  He led the team in scoring during his senior season, 1993–1994, with 15.3 points per game, and won the team MVP award in each of his last three seasons (1992, 1993, and 1994). He shared the 1992 award with teammates Todd Leslie and Cedric Neloms.

During his senior year, Rankin led the Wildcats to a thrilling 97–93 overtime berth in the National Invitation Tournament.  The bid brought the Wildcats their first taste of postseason play since 1983.

Rankin was also an academic standout.  He was named to the Academic All-America second team in 1994, and the third team in 1993.  He won a spot on the Academic All-Big Ten team each year from 1992 to 1994, and was awarded the Big Ten Medal of Honor for scholastic and athletic excellence in 1994.

References

External links
TBLStat.net Profile

1971 births
Living people
Alba Berlin players
American emigrants to Turkey
American expatriate basketball people in Germany
American expatriate basketball people in Israel
American expatriate basketball people in Spain
American expatriate basketball people in Turkey
Basketball players from Wisconsin
BC Andorra players
Expatriate basketball people in Andorra
American expatriate basketball people in Andorra
Centers (basketball)
Fenerbahçe men's basketball players
Liga ACB players
Naturalized citizens of Turkey
Northwestern Wildcats men's basketball players
Pallacanestro Biella players
Power forwards (basketball)
Turkish men's basketball players
Turkish expatriate basketball people in Germany
Turkish expatriate basketball people in Israel
Turkish people of American descent
Ülker G.S.K. basketball players
American men's basketball players